Raise Your Voice is a 2004 American teen musical drama film directed by Sean McNamara and starring Hilary Duff. Canadian rock band Three Days Grace made a cameo appearance in the film, performing the songs "Are You Ready" and "Home".

Plot
Terri Fletcher is a Flagstaff, Arizona teenager who has a passion for singing and dreams of becoming a professional singer. She wants to participate in a music program that could give her a $10,000 scholarship. Her overprotective father Simon, a second-generation restaurateur, disapproves of Terri's plans, stating that being a singer may not be a worthwhile life choice. Simon believes that Terri will get hurt if she goes to Los Angeles and would prefer if she continues running the family business. Simon thinks this is the only way to keep Terri safe.

Terri is very close to her elder brother Paul, who fully supports her dream, despite their father. At Paul's graduation-day barbecue, he has a fight with Simon, who, in the heat of it, grounds him. That night, Terri sneaks Paul out of the house to attend a Three Days Grace concert. On the way back, Paul was planning on going to college and leaving right away. They have a car accident, hit by a drunk driver. Terri awakens in the hospital, and learns that Paul was killed.

Terri blames herself for Paul's death, wants to quit singing and not attend the music program. However, her mother Frances says that it's not her fault and that Paul would have wanted Terri to attend the program. She eventually convinces Terri to go, telling Simon that Terri plans to stay with her aunt Nina in Palm Desert, California for the summer while she actually goes to Los Angeles.

Terri arrives in Los Angeles and has a few difficulties: her jacket is stolen, her cab driver is crabby, and initially can't get into the music school. While in the program, Terri makes new friends, including fun-loving DJ Kiwi, quiet pianist Sloane, and her roommate and talented violinist Denise. Terri learns a great deal about music, but has flashbacks of the car crash.

Terri also develops a mutual fondness for British songwriter Jay, but she faces competition from Robin Childers, who was with Jay the previous summer. Robin still harbors feelings for Jay, but he does not reciprocate. Jay tries to get Robin to leave him and Terri alone. On one occasion, Robin kisses Jay just as Terri walks in. Jay pushes Robin away, but Terri runs off in tears, ignoring Jay's insistence that the kiss meant nothing. Later, finding him drunk, Terri and Denise take Jay to the roof to sober up. When he does, Jay apologizes, and Terri agrees to finish the song they have been working on for the scholarship contest.

In the meantime, Simon learns of Terri's ruse and becomes furious. He then drives to Los Angeles to bring Terri home. On the final day, Simon comes to the school and Terri finds him packing up her belongings; he reams Terri for deceiving him, and for turning his sister and wife against him. Terri begs her father not to make same mistake he did with Paul and make her run, and not ruin the summer.

Ultimately, realizing how selfish he had been, he changes his mind. Terri and Jay perform the song they wrote, dedicating it to Paul. Even though Denise wins the scholarship prize, Simon is proud of his daughter and her talents, and is also glad that her last memory of Paul is one worth having (the concert), as opposed to Simon's own (their argument). Terri's teachers hope to see her next year; Simon replies that they just might. Over the end credits, the students perform together, joyously.

Cast
 Hilary Duff as Teresa "Terri" Fletcher
 Oliver James as Jay Corgan
 Lauren C. Mayhew as Robin Childers
 Dana Davis as Denise Gilmore
 Johnny Lewis as Engelbert "Kiwi" Wilson
 Rebecca De Mornay as Nina Fletcher 
 Jason Ritter as Paul Fletcher
 David Keith as Simon Fletcher
 Rita Wilson as Francis Fletcher
 Kat Dennings as Sloane
 Davida Williams as Lauren
 Fred Meyers as Matthew
 John Corbett as Mr. Torvald
 James Avery as Mr. Gantry
 Robert Trebor as Mr. Wesson
 Gibby Brand as Mr. Holcomb
 Sean McNamara as Doctor Mark Farley
 Three Days Grace as themselves

Production 
Principal photography began in Los Angeles, California on January 24, 2004, and ended the following April.

Reception

Critical reception
On Rotten Tomatoes, Raise Your Voice has an approval rating of 15% based on 84 reviews, with an average rating of 3.80/10. The consensus calls the film a "bland, formulaic tween version of Fame." On Metacritic, the film has a score of 33 out of 100 based on reviews from 24 critics, indicating "generally unfavorable reviews".

Box office
The film opened on October 8, 2004 and grossed $4,022,693 in its opening weekend at #6, behind Shark Tales second weekend, Friday Night Lights, Ladder 49s second weekend, Taxi, and The Forgottens third weekend. The film was also a flop at the box office.

By the end of its run, Raise Your Voice grossed $10,411,980 domestically and $4,455,534 internationally, totaling $14,867,514 worldwide.

Accolades
Raise Your Voice was nominated for an Artios Award for Outstanding Casting in Children's Programming Casting and a Golden Reel Award for Best Sound Editing in a Feature Film - Music/Musical.

Home media
The film was released on VHS and DVD on February 15, 2005.

Soundtrack
The soundtrack was planned to be released before the film, but it was never released because Duff released her eponymous second album with the songs featured on the film. Three Days Grace also contributed the songs "Are You Ready" and "Home" to the film, the latter from their self-titled debut album.

Unreleased track listing
 "Play It Loud" – MxPx
 "Someone's Watching Over Me" – Hilary Duff
 "Jericho" – Hilary Duff
 "Fly" – Hilary Duff
 "Shine" – Hilary Duff
 "Walking on Sunshine" – Katrina and the Waves
 "Home" – Three Days Grace
 "Are You Ready?" – Three Days Grace
 "We Might as Well Be Strangers" – Keane
 "Lift Off" – Tina Sugandh

References

External links
 
 
 
 

2004 films
2004 romantic drama films
2000s musical drama films
2000s romantic musical films
2000s teen drama films
2000s teen romance films

American musical drama films
American romantic drama films
American romantic musical films
American teen drama films
American teen musical films
American teen romance films
Brookwell McNamara Entertainment films
Films directed by Sean McNamara
Films scored by Aaron Zigman
Films set in Arizona
Films set in Los Angeles
Films set in schools
Films shot in Los Angeles
2000s English-language films
2000s American films